The 1986–87 Associate Members' Cup, known as the 1986–87 Freight Rover Trophy, was the fourth staging of the Associate Members' Cup, a knock-out competition for English football clubs in the Third Division and the Fourth Division. The winners were Mansfield Town and the runners-up were Bristol City.

The competition began on 24 November 1986 and ended with the final on 24 May 1987 at Wembley Stadium.

In the first round, there were two sections split into eight groups: North and South. In the following rounds each section gradually eliminates teams in knock-out fashion until each has a winning finalist. At this point, the two winning finalists faced each other in the combined final for the honour of the trophy.

Preliminary round

Northern Section

Southern Section

First round

Northern Section

Southern Section

Quarter-finals

Northern Section

Southern Section

Area semi-finals

Northern Section

Southern Section

Area finals

Northern Area final

Southern Area final

Final

References

1986–87
Tro